Parotocinclus cearensis is a species of catfish in the family Loricariidae. It is native to South America, where it occurs in the state of Ceará in Brazil. The species reaches 5 cm (2 inches) SL.

References 

Loricariidae
Otothyrinae
Fish described in 1977
Freshwater fish of Brazil